Manatee Road is a census-designated place (CDP) in Levy County, Florida, United States. The population was 2,244 at the 2010 census. At the 2000 census, the CDP was misspelled as "Manattee Road".

Geography
Manatee Road is located in northwestern Levy County at  (29.507549, -82.920612). It is bordered to the east by the city of Chiefland and to the northeast by unincorporated Andrews. Florida State Road 320 (Manatee Springs Road) runs through the southern part of the CDP, leading east to Chiefland and west to its end at Manatee Springs State Park.

Demographics

As of the census of 2000, there were 1,937 people, 852 households, and 593 families residing in the CDP. The racial makeup of the CDP was 96.75% White, 1.55% African American, 0.10% Native American, 0.05% Asian, 0.46% from other races, and 1.08% from two or more races. Hispanic or Latino of any race were 1.70% of the population.

There were 852 households, out of which 21.6% had children under the age of 18 living with them, 57.6% were married couples living together, 8.8% had a female householder with no husband present, and 30.3% were non-families. 25.9% of all households were made up of individuals, and 13.4% had someone living alone who was 65 years of age or older.  The average household size was 2.27 and the average family size was 2.71.

In the CDP, the population was spread out, with 19.4% under the age of 18, 5.8% from 18 to 24, 19.9% from 25 to 44, 28.1% from 45 to 64, and 26.8% who were 65 years of age or older.  The median age was 49 years. For every 100 females, there were 94.5 males.  For every 100 females age 18 and over, there were 93.8 males.

The median income for a household in the CDP was $22,306, and the median income for a family was $25,174. Males had a median income of $22,417 versus $14,200 for females. The per capita income for the CDP was $13,534.  About 17.3% of families and 21.1% of the population were below the poverty line, including 38.3% of those under age 18 and 6.6% of those age 65 or over.

References

Census-designated places in Levy County, Florida
Census-designated places in Florida